The San Jose Chamber of Commerce (abbreviated SJCC), formerly known as the Silicon Valley Organization, is a chamber of commerce representing business interests in San Jose, California. It is the largest chamber of commerce in the Silicon Valley region. Founded in 1886, the chamber has played a role in the development of the local economy and politics.

History

19th century
The San Jose Chamber of Commerce was founded in 1886 as the Santa Clara Valley Board of Trade. In 1900, it briefly became the Santa Clara Valley Improvement Association before changing its name to the San Jose Chamber of Commerce the following year.

20th century

In 1910, the chamber formed the Commission Government League to promote reforms to the San Jose city charter. Along with other upper- and middle-class progressive groups, the league forced a ballot initiative on replacing the city's political machine, which was dependent on working class voters, with a city commission government, modeled on that of Galveston, Texas, that they saw as less corrupt and more efficient. In 1914, the reform groups gained a majority of seats on the city council and appointed a commission to study charter reforms. It was dominated by the chamber and Merchant's Association and headed by Professor Thomas H. Reed of the University of California, Berkeley, who eschewed the city commission plan in favor of a council–manager government modeled on that of Dayton, Ohio.

In 1929, the chamber raised $480,000 in donations by Santa Clara County residents to acquire a  parcel of the Yñigo Ranch on the San Francisco Bay and sold it for a nominal price to the U.S. Navy to serve as an airbase for the USS Macon airship and later Moffett Federal Airfield. Renzel led an effort to pass a bond measure to pay for the land in 1940, overcoming reluctance by fiscally conservative city councilmembers and City Manager C. B. Goodwin.

In 1944, and again from 1950 to 1965, the chamber partnered with the city and county and spent more than $ on aggressive national advertising campaigns, including advertisements in The New York Times, to attract major manufacturers to the Santa Clara Valley. In the 1960s, the chamber supported City Manager A. P. "Dutch" Hamann's city expansion plans and the bond measures to fund them.

The chamber was known as the Association of Metropolitan San Jose from 1968 until reverting to its previous name in 1971. In the late 1960s, the original Migrant Mother photograph by Dorothea Lange was found in a dumpster at the chamber's headquarters, along with 31 other unretouched, vintage photos by the photographer.

By the 1980s, the area's chambers of commerce had diminished in political influence, and the Santa Clara County Manufacturers Group became the dominant political special interest group in the area. In 1988, the chamber changed its name to the San Jose Metropolitan Chamber of Commerce. In 1997, it took the name San Jose Silicon Valley Chamber of Commerce.

21st century
In 2017, the chamber rebranded as the Silicon Valley Organization (SVO) to appeal to businesses and government officials associated with Silicon Valley. Despite its new name, the organization largely continued to focus on businesses in San Jose. In 2019, the Santa Clara Chamber of Commerce, located in neighboring Santa Clara, responded by rebranding itself as the Silicon Valley Central Chamber of Commerce.

On August 26, 2021, the SVO reverted to its longstanding name, the San Jose Chamber of Commerce, to emphasize its support for small- and medium-sized businesses and distance itself from controversial political advertising by its former political action committee.

Politics 
As a business advocacy organization, the chamber consistently supports a pro-business political agenda. It supports immigration reform and opposes smart growth zoning changes that are favored by housing advocates.

Political action committee 
The Silicon Valley Organization formerly operated a political action committee. The SVO PAC spent hundreds of thousands of dollars to support business-friendly candidates in each San Jose City Council election, often in opposition to candidates supported by the South Bay Labor Council.

The SVO PAC was repeatedly criticized for racial stereotyping in its advertising, including darkened photographs of Latino councilmembers Sergio Jimenez in 2016 and Sylvia Arenas in 2021, as well as for misleadingly doctoring a photograph of another candidate in 2018.

In October 2020, the SVO PAC published a controversial webpage against Jake Tonkel's campaign to unseat Councilmember Dev Davis. It featured a photo of Black rioters in South Africa and alleged that Tonkel supported defunding the San Jose Police Department. A number of prominent for-profit and non-profit member organizations, including 36% of the SVO's board of directors, left the SVO, criticizing it for a pattern of racist advertising. Under pressure from member organizations, President and CEO Matt Mahood issued an apology and resigned, and the SVO PAC was dissolved in November 2020.

Chief executive officers 
The San Jose Chamber of Commerce has had 11 chief executive officers in its history:

 D.B. Moody, 1886–1919
 Roscoe Wyatt, 1919–1944
 Russ Pettit, 1944–1964
 Fred Burtner, 1964–1969
 Sandy Webber, 1969–1974
 Ron James, 1974–1990 
 Steve Tedesco, 1990–2000
 Jim Cunneen, 2000–2005
 Pat Dando, 2005–2011
 Matt Mahood, 2011–2020
 Derrick Seaver, 2020–present

References

Further reading

External links 
 

Chambers of commerce in California
Organizations based in San Jose, California
Organizations established in 1886
1886 establishments in California
Politics of San Jose, California